The Gnostikos (meaning The Knower or The Gnostic) is a 4th-century work by the early Christian monk Evagrius Ponticus. The Gnostikos is a brief treatise consisting of 50 chapters, which contain exhortations for experienced monks. There are manuscripts of the Gnostikos in Greek (original), Syriac, and Armenian.

It also has collections of quotes from five theologians, who are Gregory of Nazianzus, Basil of Caesarea, Athanasius, Serapion of Thmuis, and Didymus the Blind. Much of the original Greek text has been lost, although the Syriac version is complete.

There are a few English translations, as well as a French translation by Antoine Guillaumont (1989). Other modern translations include Slovenian, Polish, Italian,Evagrius Ponticus. Per conoscere lui: Esortazione a una vergine; Ai monaci; Ragioni delle osservanze monastiche; Lettera ad Anatolio; Pratico; Gnostico. Translated by Paolo Bettiolo. Magnano Biella: Qiqajon Comunità di Bose, 1996. and Dutch.

Outline
Outline of Evagrius's Gnostikos:

Chapters 1–3: Introduction
Chapter 1: Knowledge of the ascetic vs. gnostic
Chapter 2: Ascetic as passionless
Chapter 3: Gnostic as teacher
Chapters 4–11: Virtues of the gnostic teacher
Chapters 12–15: Need for gnostic to adapt self to disciples
Chapters 16–21: Content of teaching: Exegesis
Chapters 21–36: The comportment of the gnostic when teaching
Chapters 37–43: Temptations and sins of the gnostic
Chapters 44–48: Quotes from theologians
Chapter 44: Gregory of Nazianzus
Chapter 45: Basil of Caesarea
Chapter 46: Athanasius
Chapter 47: Serapion of Thmuis
Chapter 48: Didymus the Blind
Chapters 49–50: Conclusion

See also
Praktikos
Kephalaia Gnostika

References

External links
Luke Dysinger's translation of the Gnostikos

Hesychast literature
4th-century books